Streatley may refer to:
 Streatley, Bedfordshire, England
 Streatley, Berkshire, England